McCusker is a surname of Gaelic origin used predominantly in Ulster (Fermanagh, Tyrone, Armagh). Often interchangeable with Cosgrove, which was more common in parts of Armagh and in Cavan and Longford. 

McCusker, Cosgrove and other similar surnames are anglicisations of the Gaelic surnames of a number of unrelated Gaelic families of Ulster, including the:

- Mac Giolla Coisgle, Erenaghs of Derrybrusk, Fermanagh (anglicised to McCusker, McCosker, Cosgrove, McCosgrove, Cuskery, McCuskey, Cuskelly). Spread through South Ulster and Westmeath/Offaly branch. 

- Mac Coscraigh, Erenaghs of part of the lands of the Abbey of Clones, Clones Civil Parish, Monaghan 

- Mac Oscar of Magheracross and Derryvullan, Fermanagh and later Dromore (Tyrone), a branch of the Maguires, descending from Oscar Maguire

- Mac Coscraigh of Cenel Moen, Donegal/Tyrone

- McCoskerans or McCosrichans of Down

- McCoskerans of Ballinderry, Derry
Notable people with the surname include:

In arts and entertainment
 Aaron McCusker (born 1978), Northern Irish actor
 Chris McCusker (born 1958), Australian songwriter, musician and sound designer
 John McCusker (born 1973), Scottish folk musician, record producer and composer
 Michael McCusker, American film editor
 Paul McCusker (born 1958), American writer and radio producer
 David McCusker, developer of the Mork file format

In sport

Football (soccer)
 Damien McCusker (born 1966), Irish Gaelic footballer
 Fergal McCusker (born 1970), Gaelic footballer
 Marc McCusker (born 1989), Scottish footballer
 Niall McCusker (born 1980), Irish Gaelic footballer
 Richie McCusker (born 1970), Scottish footballer

Other sports
 Jim McCusker (born 1936), American football defensive tackle
 Joan McCusker (born 1965), Canadian Olympic curler
 Red McCusker, Canadian ice hockey goaltender
 Rob McCusker (born 1985), Welsh rugby player
 Riley McCusker (born 2001), American gymnast

In other fields
 Elaine McCusker, American government official
 Emmett McCusker (1889–1973), Canadian politician
 John J. McCusker, American academic in American history and economics
 Harold McCusker (1940–1990), Northern Ireland politician
 Malcolm McCusker (born 1938), Australian philanthropist and barrister, Governor of Western Australia 2011–2014